"Silent Morning" is the debut single by American singer Noel, released as the lead single from his 1987 self-titled debut studio album. It is the most successful single by Noel to date, where on November 14, 1987, it reached number 47 on the US Billboard Hot 100 singles chart. "Silent Morning" was present on the Hot 100 for 22 weeks, one of the longest chart runs of any single that failed to reach the Top 40 of the Billboard Hot 100.

Background and composition
The song came about after Noel was discovered by a man looking for singers, who invited him to a studio to record a song. While there, and with Noel having never written a song, the man gave advice for Noel to write about what he was feeling. The song that Noel recorded was originally called "Spanish Morning". After a few weeks of recording, the man disappeared. At that time, Noel worked as assistant bartender at a club, only to discover that his boss had good contacts, and knew artists like David Bowie and Mick Jagger. Noel decided to record a demo and handed it to his boss. Some weeks later Noel's boss said he had shown the song to the manager of a label, and that he liked the song but not the lyrics, and asked Noel to change them. Noel rewrote the song, and called it "Silent Morning".

Spin listed the recording of "Silent Morning" as the seventh of ten "Great Moments in Recording Studio History," due to an alleged event in which "producer Aaron Hanson put a gun to Noel's head and threatened to blow his head off if he didn't sing the song Hanson's way."

The song is rumored to be about Noel's ex girlfriend, Aleida. The two met at a dance studio on the upper west side of Manhattan called Alexis Dance Studios as teenagers.  That night, Noel asked Aleida to be his girlfriend, and they dated for several years.

Track listing and formats
 US 12" single

Charts

Weekly charts

References

1987 songs
1987 debut singles
Noel Pagan songs
4th & B'way Records singles
Music videos directed by Mark Pellington